The 2020 Furman Paladins football team represented Furman University as a member of the Southern Conference (SoCon) during the 2020–21 NCAA Division I FCS football season. Led by fourth-year head coach Clay Hendrix, the Paladins compiled an overall record of 3–4 with an identical mark in conference play, placing sixth in the SoCon. Furman home games at Paladin Stadium in Greenville, South Carolina.

Schedule
Furman had a game scheduled against Tennessee, which was canceled due to the COVID-19 pandemic.

References

Furman
Furman Paladins football seasons
Furman Paladins football